The 2017 Federation Cup also known as Walton Federation Cup 2017 due to the sponsorship from Walton was the 29th edition of the tournament. A total of 12 teams competed in this tournament. Dhaka Abahani was the winner of previous edition of the tournament.

The winner of the tournament earned the slot of playing qualifying round of the 2018 AFC Cup.

Venues

Group stage
The twelve participants were divided into four groups. The top two teams for each group qualified for the quarterfinals.

Group A

Group B

Group C

Group D

Bracket

Quarterfinals

Semifinals

Final

Goal scorers

Top 8

References

Bangladesh Federation Cup
2017 in Bangladeshi football